Longtown is an unincorporated community located in Panola County, Mississippi.

Mabel Welch (1890-1981), the second registered female architect in Texas, was born on a plantation near Longtown.

References

External links
 Map of Mississippi from 1836 showing the location of Longtown within Chickasaw territory

Unincorporated communities in Panola County, Mississippi
Unincorporated communities in Mississippi